Appletree Eyot is an island in the River Thames at Reading, Berkshire, in England.

Poplar Island is very close to it. The two islands are in the middle of the river, so that navigation goes to each side of them according to the rules of the river. Appletree Eyot is densely covered by trees.

See also
Islands in the River Thames

References

Islands of the River Thames
Geography of Reading, Berkshire